Hero is a 2006 Indian Bengali-language action comedy film directed by Swapan Saha. This film music was composed by Jeet Ganguly.This film released under the banner of Surinder Films. The film is a remake of the 2002 Kannada movie Appu.

Plot
Subhankar Roy (Jeet) was a college goer. He was the son of head constable Bhabani Shankar Roy (Abdur Razzak) who was a very respectable person and had a very good police record in department. He aspires his son to be a police officer of higher rank although himself being a constable. He had great aspirations from his son. Subhankar on the other hand was very arrogant, fun loving and happy-go-lucky person who loves spending time with friends gossiping and playing foul games. One such game he played with some anti socials by eloping with their sister on her marriage day and gave her hands to someone else. They attacked him and bleeding Subhankar was taken to hospital by Puja Sen (Koel Mallick) and she donated her blood to him as his blood group got matched with hers. Shuvo fell in love with Puja without seeing her face at first instant. He went to her for thanking her for saving his life but instead he said "I Love You" to which Puja surprisingly rejected. Then, he started meeting her everywhere and started annoying her against her wishes. Puja was the sister of Police Superintendent Indrajit Sen (Tapas Paul). Puja told her brother about Shuvo and her strong hatred towards him for his annoying attitude by which he forcefully wanting Puja. Bhabani Shankar was a close mate of Indrajit as he saved latter's life in a mishap. Since then, Indrajit owes his life to him and thinks him as his best friend in toughest times. Shuvo was threatened and beaten by Indrajit for disturbing his sister unaware that he was son of none other than Bhabani Shankar to which Bhabani Shankar opposed him and said Love has no religion and no caste. Meanwhile, Indrajit hired an anti social goon Baburam (Sumit Ganguly) to kill Shuvo to which Puja couldn't resist as she didn't want to kill him went off to save Shuvo, but accidentally Puja got injured and Shuvo hospitalized her. Seeing all his constant approaches and true love for her, Puja started falling in love with Shuvo to which Indrajit didn't accept their relation as he still thinks that Shuvo is not a perfect match for his sister and he still annoys her. Indrajit tried to kill Shuvo at any cost. But with the help of Madhabi (Laboni Sarkar) and his friends, Shuvo and Puja escaped from their house. Baburam harassed them but ultimately Love wins over Hatred such that Indrajit accepted Puja and Shuvo's relation and he agreed for their marriage. Both of them finally got married.

Cast
 Jeet as Subhankar Roy aka Shuvo, Son of Head constable Bhabani Shankar Roy
 Tapas Paul as Inspector Indrajit Sen
 Koel Mallick as Puja Sen, Sister of Indrajit Sen
 Laboni Sarkar as Madhabi Sen, Puja's Sister-in-law
 Samata Das as Subho's Sister
 Kanchan Mullick as Shuvo's college friend
 Abdur Razzak as Bhabani Shankar Roy, Shuvo's Father
 Sumit Ganguly as Baburam, a local goon
 Shantilal Mukherjee as Police Constable
 N.K. Salil as Shuvo's college friend
 Kalyani Mondal as Shuvo's Mother
 Shyamal Dutta as Police Inspector

Soundtrack

References

External links
 
 Hero  on Gomolo

2006 films
Bengali-language Indian films
Bengali remakes of Kannada films
Films scored by Jeet Ganguly
Indian romantic action films
Films directed by Swapan Saha
Bengali action comedy films
2000s Bengali-language films